Pipers River is a rural residential locality in the local government areas (LGA) of George Town (98%) and Launceston (2%) in the Launceston LGA region of Tasmania. The 2016 census recorded a population of 426 for the state suburb of Pipers River.
It is a small township on the river of the same name in the north of Tasmania. 

There is a tennis court, general store/takeaway, a fire station, church and cemetery. Pipers River Road serves as a thoroughfare connecting Launceston to the Bridport Highway. The road is sealed and well developed; however, there are many sharp corners, particularly around Karoola.

History 
Pipers River was gazetted as a locality in 1964. It was named after Ensign H Piper, a member of the expedition to the district in 1804 led by Colonel William Paterson.
Piper's River Post Office opened on 6 April 1865. It was renamed Piper's River Upper in 1870 and Piper's River in 1887.

Geography
Pipers River (the watercourse) flows through from south to north.

Road infrastructure 
Route B83 (Pipers River Road) runs from the south to the town in the centre, where it intersects with Route B82 (Bridport Road) which passes through from west to east.

Notes and references

External links
 Resort in Pipers River

Towns in Tasmania
Localities of George Town Council
Localities of City of Launceston